Ronny Fredrik Ansnes (28 June 1989 – c.15 July 2018) was a Norwegian cross-country skier.

He made his World Cup debut in February 2011 in Drammen, also breaking the top 15-barrier with a 13th place in the 15 kilometre race. He also finished second in a relay race in November 2011 in Sjusjøen. Ansnes also contested the Holmenkollen 50 kilometre race in 2012 and 2013 and a World Cup race in La Clusaz in January 2013 before retiring in 2014. He also won an individual silver medal at the Norwegian Championships, the 15 kilometre race in 2012, as well as a relay bronze medal in 2010.

He hailed from Klæbu and represented the sports club Byåsen IL.

Ansnes drowned in July 2018 in the Resa river in Resdalen, Meldal. He was found on 16 July, probably having drowned on the previous day. He was 29.

Cross-country skiing results
All results are sourced from the International Ski Federation (FIS).

World Cup

Team podiums

 1 podium – (1 )

References 

1989 births
2018 deaths
Deaths by drowning in Norway
People from Klæbu
Norwegian male cross-country skiers
Sportspeople from Trøndelag